A citizens' assembly is a deliberative assembly of randomly selected citizens tasked with considering specific issues of national importance.

Citizens' Assembly may also refer to:

 Citizen legislature or "citizens' assembly", a U.S. term for a legislature where legislators have other jobs
 Citizens Assembly of Magallanes, involved in the 2011 Magallanes protests
 Citizens' Assembly (Ireland), established in 2016
 Citizens' assembly (Venezuela), a direct democracy component of a Communal Council
 Helsinki Citizens' Assembly, a human rights NGO
 Ecclesia (ancient Greece), an assembly of citizens

See also
 :Category:Citizens' assemblies
 Popular assembly